Karsten Creek Golf Club is located  west on State Highway 51, just outside Stillwater, Oklahoma.  It replaced Lakeside Golf Course as the home course of the Oklahoma State University (OSU) Men's and Women's golf teams in 1994. Karsten Creek now stands as one of the most respected college golf courses in America, and is a powerful aid in the recruiting and development of athletes in the 11-time national champion Cowboy golf program.

Mike Holder, a former Cowboy golf coach and current athletic director at Oklahoma State, convinced famed golf course architect Tom Fazio to design the course in hopes of creating one of the most challenging courses in the United States on the Oklahoma plains.

Lake Louise comes into play on many holes, with the greens lying just a few yards away from the water on some occasions. Karsten Creek and Lake Louise earned their names to honor Karsten Solheim, founder of Karsten Manufacturing (manufacturer of the PING brand of golf clubs), and his wife Louise, both of whom have been great supporters of the Oklahoma State golf program for many years. The $4.5 million clubhouse was completed in June 2001.

Honors
Karsten Creek was opened on May 9, 1994, and earned the distinction of "Best New Public Course for 1994" by Golf Digest and has earned numerous accolades since. Golf Digest honored Karsten Creek again in 1998, this time awarding the course its first five-star rating, giving Karsten Creek the distinction of being among only ten courses in the United States to earn such an honor. Karsten Creek was selected as host site for the NCAA Men's Golf Championship in 2003, 2011, and 2018. Travel & Leisure Golf magazine ranked Karsten Creek as the best college course in the country.

Scorecard

Services available
Restaurant: Breakfast (weekends only) Lunch (everyday) Dinners (limited)
Pro-Shop Merchandise & Apparel
PING Golf Clubs
Certified PING Club Fittings
Individual and Group Instruction
Junior Golf Instruction
Meetings & Events
Lodging

References

External links
Karsten Creek official site
OSU Men's Golf
Golf A guide to Best Golf clubs across U.S

Oklahoma State University
College golf clubs and courses in the United States
Golf clubs and courses in Oklahoma
Golf clubs and courses designed by Tom Fazio
Buildings and structures in Payne County, Oklahoma
1994 establishments in Oklahoma